Willie B. (C. 1957 - February 2, 2000)  was a western lowland gorilla who lived at the Zoo of Atlanta for 39 years, from 1961 until his death on February 2, 2000. He was named after the former mayor of Atlanta, William Berry Hartsfield. Willie B.  was kept in isolation for 27 years with only a television and a tire swing to keep him company. In 1988,  he was moved to an outside exhibit and allowed to socialize and raise a family. He then embraced his role as silverback and leader of a troop.

Willie B. was the second Gorilla known by that name at the Atlanta Zoo. The previous Willie B had died at the age of 3 shortly before the better-known successor was purchased. Both Willie B's had been purchased from international gorilla hunter Dr. Deets Pickett of Kansas City. The second Willie B. cost $5,500 to obtain for the zoo. 

Willie B. fathered five offspring at Zoo Atlanta: Kudzoo, Olympia, Sukari, Kidogo, and Lulu. When he died at the age of 41, he was the oldest gorilla in the United States to have fathered offspring. Kidogo, the only male offspring, took on the name Willie B., Jr. after his father died, taking his place as the heir.

More than 5,000 people attended the memorial ceremony held in his honor, and the zoo now has a life-size bronze statue of him on permanent display outside the Gorilla habitat.  His remains were cremated and 80 percent of his remains were kept in a bronze box in the bronze statue at Zoo Atlanta and the other 20 percent were flown back to the African jungle. The Atlanta Silverbacks FC soccer team was named in his honor.

See also
 List of individual apes

References

Individual gorillas
Tourist attractions in Atlanta
1961 animal births
2000 animal deaths
Individual animals in the United States
Atlanta Silverbacks